Aafje Heynis (2 May 1924 – 16 December 2015) was a Dutch contralto. In 1961, she was awarded the Harriet Cohen International Music Award. A tea rose, hybridised by Buisman 1964, was named after her. She died on 16 December 2015, aged 91.

Discography 
 Bach, Handel : Sacred Arias, Pierre Palla, Walther Schneiderhan (violinist), Nikolaus Hübner, Meindert Boekel ; Vienna Symphony Orchestra, Amsterdam Chamber Orchestra, Prop Musica Choir ; Dir. Hans Gillesberger, Marinus Voorberg, Lex Karsemeijer.
 Bach : Cantatas BWV 170 & 169, Sacred Songs, Albert de Klerk, Simon Jansen ; Netherlands Chamber Orchestra, Netherlands Bach Society Choir, Szymon Goldberg.
 Brahms : Choral Works & Overtures. Vienna Singverein, Vienna Symphony Orchestra; Dir. Wolfgang Sawallisch.
 Brahms : Alto Rhapsody, Royal Concertgebouw Orchestra, Apollo Royal Male Choir, Eduard Van Beinum (1958).
 Brahms, Vier ernste Gesänge, piano : Johan van den Boogert (1958).
 Mahler : Symphony No. 2 "Resurrection", Elly Ameling, Royal Concertgebouw Orchestra, Netherlands Radio Chorus, Bernard Haitink, 1968.
 Schubert : Rosamunde, Royal Concertgebouw Orchestra, Bernard Haitink.
Antonio Vivaldi : The five compositions on Christ's Passion and Introduction to the Miserere, I Solisti Di Milano, Angelo Ephrikian, 1966.
Compilations
 Het Puik van zoete kelen (The Cream of Glorious Voices) Philips Dutch Masters 464 385-2 (includes her performance "Sea Slumber Song" by Edward Elgar)
 Les rarissimes de Aafje Heinis : Gluck, Haydn, Dorjak, Franck, Caplet, Brahms, Schuinbert, R. Strauss, Wolf, Mahler (EMI, 2005)

References

External links
 MusicWeb reviews of Philips Bach and Handel arias CD, accessed 21 January 2010
 Dutch Divas - Aafje Heynis, contralto
 Dutch Divas - Aafje Heynis - zangeres zonder pretenties (Dutch – more extensive set of five pages)
 Six Dutch Contraltos (includes MP3 of Sir Edward Elgar's Sea Slumber Song)
 Bach Cantatas page on Aafje Heynis
 

1924 births
2015 deaths
Operatic contraltos
People from Zaanstad
Dutch contraltos
20th-century Dutch women opera singers